The Tinker Brothers are stencil artists from the Netherlands. They are known for their signature style of invisible paintings.

Life and work
In 2012, they dropped out of their respective studies at the University of Applied Sciences and the University of Technology and quit their jobs to fulfill their dream of becoming artists. They spend the next years experimenting with different techniques and media.

What turned out to be a process of years, growing through different styles and media, they eventually discovered their signature style; merging the rawness and honesty of stencil art as a technique with the punch of pop, subtlety, and profoundness of minimalism.
 
They use bold, powerful yet simple imagery in their work about love, the troubles of this world, beauty, and truth.

References 

Living people
Dutch contemporary artists
Graffiti artists
Pop artists
Year of birth missing (living people)